Ambgarh village comes under the Jalandhar West development block of Jalandhar. Jalandhar is a district in the Indian state of Punjab.

Ambgarh lies on the Kartarpur-Kishangarh road. The nearest railway station to Ambgarh is Kartarpur Railway station at 4 km from it.

Ambgarh's post office is Rahimpur.

References 

Villages in Jalandhar district